Gateway is a 1993 metal sculpture by Hans Van de Bovenkamp, installed in Oklahoma City's Myriad Botanical Gardens, in the U.S. state of Oklahoma. The abstract artwork was dedicated on November 16, 1993, and measures approximately 16 x 15 x 5 ft.

See also

 1993 in art

References

1993 establishments in Oklahoma
1993 sculptures
Abstract sculptures in the United States
Metal sculptures
Outdoor sculptures in Oklahoma City